Lee Hui-seong (29 December 1924 – 6 June 2022) was a South Korean military officer and politician. An independent, he served as Chief of Staff of the Republic of Korea Army from 1979 to 1981 and was Minister of Transport from 1982 to 1983.

He died on 6 June 2022, at the age of 97.

References

1924 births
2022 deaths
Chiefs of Staff of the Army (South Korea)
Directors of the Korean Central Intelligence Agency
South Korean military personnel of the Korean War
Korean military personnel of the Vietnam War
Korea Military Academy alumni
Academic staff of Seoul National University
Academic staff of Yonsei University
People from South Gyeongsang Province